Cameron Gray (born 22 October 1998) is a Caymanian footballer.

Career statistics

International

References

1998 births
Living people
Association football defenders
Caymanian footballers
Cayman Islands youth international footballers
Cayman Islands international footballers
Caymanian expatriate footballers
Reading F.C. players
Flackwell Heath F.C. players
Caymanian expatriate sportspeople in England
Expatriate footballers in England